7th Heaven is an American family drama television series created and produced by Brenda Hampton. The series debuted on August 26, 1996, on The WB, where it aired for ten seasons, making it the longest running series in the history of the network. Following the shutdown of The WB and its merger with UPN to form The CW, the series aired on the new network on September 25, 2006, for its eleventh and final season, airing its final episode on May 13, 2007. 7th Heaven was the last series to be produced by Spelling Television (later produced by CBS Paramount Network Television for the eleventh and final season) before it was shut down and became an in-name-only unit of CBS Television Studios.

Premise
The series follows Reverend Eric Camden, a Protestant minister living in the fictional town of Glenoak, California, and his wife Annie as they deal with the drama of raising seven children ranging in age from babies to adults with families of their own.

Main cast and characters

 Stephen Collins as Eric Camden
 Catherine Hicks as Annie Camden
 Barry Watson as Matt Camden (seasons 1–6 and 9; recurring 7–8, special guest 10)
 David Gallagher as Simon Camden (seasons 1–7 and 9–10; recurring season 8)
 Jessica Biel as Mary Camden (seasons 1–6; recurring season 7, special guest 8 and 10)
 Beverley Mitchell as Lucy Camden
 Mackenzie Rosman as Ruthie Camden
 Happy the Dog as herself
 Chaz Lamar Shepherd as John Hamilton (seasons 4–5; recurring in seasons 1–3)
 Maureen Flannigan as Shana Sullivan (season 4; recurring in season 3)
 Adam LaVorgna as Robbie Palmer (seasons 5–7; recurring in season 4)
 Nikolas Brino as Sam Camden (seasons 6–11; uncredited in seasons 3–4, featured in season 5)
 Lorenzo Brino as David Camden (seasons 6–11; uncredited in seasons 3–4, featured in season 5)
 Geoff Stults as Ben Kinkirk (season 7; recurring in seasons 6 and 8–11)
 George Stults as Kevin Kinkirk (seasons 7–11; recurring in season 6)
 Ashlee Simpson as Cecilia Smith (seasons 7–8)
 Rachel Blanchard as Roxanne Richardson (seasons 7–8)
 Jeremy London as Chandler Hampton (seasons 7–8)
 Scotty Leavenworth as Peter Petrowski (season 8; recurring in season 7)
 Tyler Hoechlin as Martin Brewer (seasons 8–11)
 Sarah Thompson as Rosanna "Rose" Taylor (season 10; recurring in season 9)
 Haylie Duff as Sandy Jameson (seasons 10–11)
 Megan Henning as Meredith Davies (season 10)

Episodes

Reception

Critical reception
The Parents Television Council (PTC) often cited 7th Heaven among the top ten most family-friendly shows. The show was praised for its positive portrayal of a cleric and for promoting honesty, respect for parental authority, and the importance of a strong family and a good education through its storylines. It was proclaimed the best show in 1998-1999 by the PTC. The council also explained "7th Heaven manages to provide moral solutions to tough issues facing teenagers without seeming preachy or heavy-handed. Additionally, unlike most TV series, 7th Heaven shows the consequences of reckless and irresponsible behavior." It was also noted that "While addressing topics such as premarital sex and peer pressure, these parents [Annie and Eric] are eager to provide wise counsel along with love and understanding."

However, other critics feel differently about the show, citing 7th Heaven as  "arguably one of the worst long-running shows on television". Reasons given include heavy-handed moralizing, Christian propaganda, and depiction of a caricature of a real family, that is "so clean it is obscene".

Some criticize the predictable plotlines of each episode, that follow always the same pattern: 
"One of the Camden family has a problem and/or secret; some sort of Three's Company-esque misunderstanding ensues as a result of that problem and/or secret; a confrontation and/or intervention takes place, usually involving a short sermon delivered by one of the Camden parents; and whoever stands at the center of the drama eventually figures out how to 'do the right thing.'" On top of this, implausible scenarios are seen to be regularly included, such as the daughter Mary's absence from the show for several seasons being scarcely explained with the character  being busy, wayward or in New York.

According to one critic, "the sappiness and sanctimony of the characters often made the moral lessons impossible to swallow".  Also, the show is said to show an obsession with premarital sex. In this regard, the parents and the oldest son Matt sometimes depict a sense of ownership of the sexuality of their daughters (respective sisters) Lucy and Mary, by threatening potential romantic interests or negotiating their daughters' romantic rights.

U.S. ratings 
7th Heaven was the most watched TV series ever on the WB. It holds the record for the WB's most watched hour at 12.5 million viewers, on February 8, 1999; 19 of the WB's 20 most watched hours were from 7th Heaven. On May 8, 2006, it was watched by 7.56 million viewers, the highest rating for the WB since January 2005. When the show moved to the CW, ratings dropped. Possible reasons for the decline include an aired "Countdown to Goodbye" ad campaign for the last six months of the 2005–06 season, which promoted it as the final season ever; though the CW announced the series' unexpected renewal, it didn't promote the new season strongly via billboards, bus stops, magazine or on-air promos. Lastly, the network moved 7th Heaven from its long-established Monday night slot to Sunday nights, causing ratings to drop further. The series had a season average of just 3.3 million on the new network, losing 36% of the previous year's audience. It was the third most watched scripted show on the CW. Overall, it was the seventh most watched show.

Awards and nominations 
 Emmy Awards
 1997: Outstanding Art Direction for a Series (Patricia Van Ryker and Mary Ann Good) – Nominated
 ASCAP Film and Television Music Awards
 2000: Top TV Series (Dan Foliart) – Won
 2001: Top TV Series (Dan Foliart) – Won
 Family Television Awards
 1999: Best Drama – Won
 2002: Best Drama – Won
 Kids' Choice Awards
 1999: Favorite Television Show – Nominated
 2000: Favorite Animal Star (Happy the dog) – Nominated
 2001: Favorite Television Show – Nominated
 2002: Favorite Television Show – Nominated
 2003: Favorite Television Show – Nominated
 TV Guide Awards
 1999: Best Show You're not Watching – Won
 2000: Favorite TV Pet (Happy the dog) – Nominated
 Teen Choice Awards
 1999: TV Choice Actor (Barry Watson) – Nominated
 1999: TV Choice Drama – Nominated
 2000: TV Choice Drama – Nominated
 2001: TV Choice Actor (Barry Watson) – Nominated
 2001: TV Choice Drama – Nominated
 2002: TV Choice Drama/Action Adventure – Won
 2002: TV Choice Actor in Drama (Barry Watson) – Won
 2002: TV Choice Actress in Drama (Jessica Biel) – Nominated
 2003: TV Choice Drama/Action Adventure – Won
 2003: TV Choice Actor in Drama/Action Adventure (David Gallagher) – Won
 2003: TV Choice Breakout Star – Male (George Stults) – Won
 2003: TV Choice Actress in Drama/Action Adventure (Jessica Biel) – Nominated
 2003: TV Choice Breakout Star – Female (Ashlee Simpson) – Nominated
 2004: TV Choice Breakout Star – Male (Tyler Hoechlin) – Nominated
 2004: TV Choice Actor in Drama/Action Adventure (David Gallagher) – Nominated
 2004: TV Choice Drama/Action Adventure – Nominated
 2005: TV Choice Actor in Drama/Action Adventure (Tyler Hoechlin) – Nominated
 2005: TV Choice Actress in Drama/Action Adventure (Beverley Mitchell) – Nominated
 2005: TV Choice Parental Units (Stephen Collins and Catherine Hicks) – Nominated
 2005: TV Choice Drama/Action Adventure – Nominated
 2006: TV Choice Breakout Star – Female (Haylie Duff) – Nominated
 2006: TV Choice Parental Units (Stephen Collins and Catherine Hicks) – Nominated
 Young Artist Awards
 1997: Best Family TV Drama Series – Won
 1997: Best Performance in a Drama Series – Young Actress (Beverley Mitchell) – Won
 1997: Best Performance in a Drama Series – Young Actor (David Gallagher) – Nominated
 1997: Best Performance in a TV Comedy/Drama – Supporting Young Actress Age Ten or Under (Mackenzie Rosman) – Nominated
 1998: Best Family TV Drama Series – Won (tied with Promised Land)
 1998: Best Performance in a TV Drama Series – Leading Young Actress (Beverley Mitchell) – Won (tied with Sarah Schaub)
 1998: Best Performance in a TV Drama Series – Guest Starring Young Actor (Bobby Brewer) – Nominated
 1998: Best Performance in a TV Drama Series – Guest Starring Young Actress (Danielle Keaton) – Nominated
 1998: Best Performance in a TV Drama Series – Guest Starring Young Actress (Molly Orr) – Nominated
 1998: Best Performance in a TV Drama Series – Leading Young Actor (David Gallagher) – Nominated
 1998: Best Performance in a TV Drama Series – Leading Young Actress (Jessica Biel) – Nominated
 1998: Best Performance in a TV Drama Series – Supporting Young Actress (Mackenzie Rosman) – Nominated
 1999: Best Family TV Drama Series – Nominated
 1999: Best Performance in a TV Drama Series – Guest Starring Young Actor (Craig Hauer) – Nominated
 1999: Best Performance in a TV Series – Young Ensemble (Beverley Mitchell, Barry Watson, Jessica Biel, David Gallagher, Mackenzie Rosman) – Nominated
 2000: Best Performance in a TV Drama Series – Guest Starring Young Actress (Kaitlin Cullum) – Won
 2000: Best Performance in a TV Drama Series – Leading Young Actress (Beverley Mitchell) – Won
 2000: Best Family TV Series – Drama – Nominated
 2001: Best Performance in a TV Drama Series – Guest Starring Young Actress (Brooke Anne Smith) – Won
 2001: Best Family TV Drama Series – Nominated
 2001: Best Performance in a TV Drama Series – Guest Starring Young Actress (Jamie Lauren) – Nominated
 2002: Best Family TV Drama Series – Nominated
 2002: Best Performance in a TV Drama Series – Guest Starring Young Actress (Ashley Edner) – Nominated
 2002: Best Performance in a TV Drama Series – Leading Young Actor (David Gallagher) – Nominated
 2002: Best Performance in a TV Drama Series – Supporting Young Actress (Mackenzie Rosman) – Nominated
 2004: Best Performance in a TV Series (Comedy or Drama) – Supporting Young Actress (Mackenzie Rosman) – Won
 2005: Best Family Television Series (Drama) – Nominated
 2005: Best Performance in a TV Series (Comedy or Drama) – Leading Young Actor (Tyler Hoechlin) – Nominated
 2006: Best Performance in a TV Series (Comedy or Drama) – Young Actor Age Ten or Younger (Drake Johnston) – Nominated
 2007: Best Family Television Series (Drama) – Nominated
 2007: Best Performance in a TV Series (Comedy or Drama) – Supporting Young Actress (Mackenzie Rosman) – Nominated
 2007: Best Performance in a TV Series (Comedy or Drama) – Young Actor Age Ten or Younger (Nikolas Brino and Lorenzo Brino) – Nominated
 2008: Best Performance in a TV Series – Young Actor Ten or Under (Lorenzo Brino) – Nominated
 2008: Best Performance in a TV Series – Young Actor Ten or Under (Nikolas Brino) – Nominated
 Young Star Awards
 1997: Best Performance by a Young Actor in a Drama TV Series (David Gallagher) – Nominated
 1998: Best Performance by a Young Actress in a Drama TV Series (Beverley Mitchell) – Nominated
 1998: Best Performance by a Young Actress in a Drama TV Series (Jessica Biel) – Nominated
 1998: Best Performance by a Young Actor in a Drama TV Series (David Gallagher) – Won
 1999: Best Performance by a Young Actor in a Drama TV Series (David Gallagher) – Nominated
 2000: Best Performance by a Young Actor in a Drama TV Series (David Gallagher) – Nominated
 2000: Best Young Ensemble Cast – Television (David Gallagher, Jessica Biel, Beverley Mitchell, Mackenzie Rosman) – Nominated

Availability

Syndication
CBS Media Ventures handles the domestic and international distribution of the series. Season one episodes were retitled 7th Heaven Beginnings. Although the series did not receive a rating other than TV-G throughout its 11-season run, reruns on some cable/satellite channels have been given either a TV-PG or TV-14 rating (depending on the subject matter).

In the United States, the show began airing reruns in off-network syndication on September 25, 2000, but ceased to air in syndication in September 2002, while the series was still in first-run broadcast on The WB and later on The CW. The show then aired on the ABC Family channel from the fall of 2002 until 2008. Then, it was announced on April 1, 2010, that ABC Family had re-obtained the rights to the series, and would begin airing it at 11 a.m. (ET/PT) on weekdays beginning April 12, 2010. However, after one week, ABC Family abruptly pulled the show and replaced it with a third daily airing of Gilmore Girls.

, GMC (now known as UP) is the first network to air 7th Heaven in the United States since 2010 and began airing the series with a marathon on July 7, 2012. Due to allegations of child molestation against Stephen Collins, the network pulled the series from its schedule as of the afternoon of October 7, 2014. 7th Heaven briefly returned to UP in December 2014; however, it was quickly removed from the schedule. UP CEO Charley Humbard stated, "We brought the show back because many viewers expressed they could separate allegations against one actor from the fictional series itself. As it turns out, they cannot." However, in the summer of 2015, UP brought back the series, where from then until 2019 it aired weekdays from 12:00PM to 3:00 PM. It was again pulled from UP's schedule afterwards. Previously, it aired on GetTV and Hallmark Drama.

Home media
CBS DVD (distributed by Paramount Home Entertainment) has released 7th Heaven on DVD. They have released all 11 seasons in Region 1. In region 2, seasons 1-7 have been released while in region 4 the first 6 seasons have been released on DVD.

On August 22, 2017, it was announced that the complete series would be released on DVD for November 14.

References

External links 

 
 

1990s American drama television series
1996 American television series debuts
2000s American drama television series
2007 American television series endings
American primetime television soap operas
American television soap operas
Christian entertainment television series
The CW original programming
English-language television shows
Teenage pregnancy in television
Television shows set in California
Television series about families
Television series by CBS Studios
Television series by Spelling Television
The WB original programming
Television series created by Brenda Hampton
Evangelical drama television series
Television series about siblings
Serial drama television series